Gülüzənbinə (also, Guluzan-Bina, Gyuluzanbina, Gyulyuzambina, and Gyulyuzanbina) is a village in the Balakan Rayon of Azerbaijan.  The village forms part of the municipality of Hənifə.

References 

Populated places in Balakan District